The following list of organizations possess the capability to conduct Special Reconnaissance (SR) and other special operations roles, with SR often by specialists within them. Certain organizations are tasked for response involving areas contaminated by chemicals, biological agents, or radioactivity.

Current

Albania
Special Operations Battalion (Albania) (BOS)

Algeria
Groupe d'Intervention Spécial (GIS)

Australia
Special Air Service Regiment (SASR)
2nd Commando Regiment

Brazil
 Parachute Infantry Brigade (Brigada de Infantaria Pára-quedista)
 Special Operations Command (Comando de Operações Especiais)
 Marine Special Operations Battalion (Batalhão de Operações Especiais de Fuzileiros Navais, Batalhão Tonelero)

Bulgaria
68th Special Operations Brigade with Special Operations Battalion

Canada
 Joint Task Force 2 (JTF2), the Canadian Forces’ special operations and counter-terrorism unit	
 Canadian Special Operations Regiment (CSOR)

China
 People's Liberation Army Special Operations Forces
 Guangzhou Military Region Special Forces Unit - Established in 1988 as the PLA’s first special reconnaissance group, and was later expanded in 2000 to become the first PLA special operations unit to be capable of air, sea, and land operations.
 Chengdu Military Region Special Forces Unit – Nickname “Falcon”. Established in 1992, this unit is specialised in target locating and indicating, airborne insertion, sabotage and offensive strike, and emergency evacuation. The unit was also used by Chengdu MR to experiment with various new concept equipment and tactics, including the digitised army soldier system and high-mobility land weapon platforms.
 Beijing Military Region Special Forces Unit - Established in the early 1990s, this unit is equipped with various “high-tech” equipment including unmanned aerial reconnaissance vehicle (UARV), individual explosion device, handheld laser dazzling weapon, etc.
 Shenyang Military Region Special Forces Unit
 Nanjing Military Region Special Forces Unit - Nickname “Flying Dragon”
 Nanjing Military Region Special Forces Unit - Nickname “Eagle”
 Lanzhou Military Region Special Forces Unit

Czech Republic
102nd Reconnaissance Battalion of General Karel Palecek
601st Special Forces Group

Denmark
 Jægerkorpset (Danish Army)
 Frømandskorpset (Royal Danish Navy)
 Special Support and Reconnaissance Company (Danish Home Guard)

France
1st Marine Infantry Parachute Regiment
13th Parachute Dragoon Regiment
Commando de Penfentenyo

India
Special Frontier Force
MARCOS
Para Commandos (India)
Garud Commando Force

Indonesia
Kopassus
Combat Reconnaissance Platoon (Ton Taipur)
Taifib
Kopaska

Ireland
Army Ranger Wing (ARW)
Directorate of Military Intelligence

Israel
Sayeret Matkal
Shayetet 13
Shaldag Unit
Maglan

Italy

185º Reggimento paracadutisti ricognizione acquisizione obiettivi - Esercito Italiano

Netherlands
Korps Commandotroepen

New Zealand
New Zealand Special Air Service (NZSAS)

Norway
Forsvarets Spesialkommando - Army SOF 	
Marinejegerkommandoen - Navy SOF

Philippines
Light Reaction Regiment
Special Operations Command
Scout Ranger Regiment
Philippine Marine Corps
Naval Special Operations Command  
Marine Special Operations Group 
Special Forces Regiment (Airborne)
Special Action Force of the Philippine National Police

Poland
Jednostka Wojskowa Grom
Jednostka Wojskowa Komandosów
Jednostka Wojskowa Formoza
Jednostka Wojskowa Agat
Jednostka Wojskowa Nil
2 Hrubieszowski Pułk Rozpoznawczy
9 Warmiński Pułk Rozpoznawczy

Portugal
Special Operations Force of the Portuguese Army
Air-Land Pathfinders Company of the Portuguese Army
Special Actions Detachment of the Portuguese Navy

Russia
Spetsnaz

 Federal Security Service "FSB"
 Alpha Group Directorate "A" of the FSB Special Purpose Center (TsSN FSB) is an elite, stand-alone sub-unit of Russia's special forces.
 Vympel Group Directorate "B"  Vympel Group is an elite Russian spetsnaz unit under the command of the FSB. (TsSN FSB)
 Armed Forces of the Russian Federation
 Spetsnaz GRU 2nd, 3rd, 10th, 14th, 16th, 24th, and 25th Spetsnaz Brigade (obrSpN)
 45th Detached Reconnaissance Regiment Spetsnaz VDV (orpSpN)
 Russian commando frogmen 42nd, 420th, 431st, and 561st Naval Reconnaissance Spetsnaz Point (omrpSpN)
 Voennaya Razvedka "Military intelligence" personnel/units within larger formations in ground troops, airborne troops and marines. Intelligence battalion in the divisions, reconnaissance company in the brigade, a reconnaissance platoon in the regiment. The same level of training as Spetsnaz GRU but not controlled by the GRU. A bat is their mascot.

Sri Lanka
Special Forces Regiment
Special Boat Squadron

Sweden
Fallskärmsjägarna

Ukraine
140th Separate Reconnaissance Battalion of Ukrainian Naval Infantry

United Kingdom
Special Air Service
Special Boat Service
Special Reconnaissance Regiment
Pathfinder Platoon of 16 Air Assault Brigade
Brigade Reconnaissance Force, 3 Commando Brigade
4/73 (Sphinx) Special Observation Post Battery RA
Honourable Artillery Company
148 (Meiktila) Battery Royal Artillery

United States

Central Intelligence Agency Special Activities Division (SAD)
Federal Bureau of Investigation
FBI Hostage Rescue Team
FBI SWAT
75th Ranger Regiment
75th Ranger Regiment, Regimental Reconnaissance Company (RRC)
US Army Pathfinders
Long Range Surveillance Units (LRS)
United States Army Special Forces (Green Berets)
United States Army SOT-A (Special Operations Team-Alpha)
United States Army Special Reconnaissance Platoons
 Marine-Navy Special Operations Reconnaissance (SOR)
1st Special Forces Operational Detachment-Delta (Delta Force or Combat Applications Group)
Intelligence Support Activity
United States Navy SEALs
United States Naval Special Warfare Development Group (DEVGRU)
Air Force Special Tactics Combat Controllers 
Air Force Special Reconnaissance (SR)
United States Marine Corps Forces Special Operations Command (MARSOC)
United States Marine Corps Force Reconnaissance
United States Marine Corps Reconnaissance Battalions
United States Marine Corps Radio Reconnaissance Platoons
United States Marine Corps Scout Snipers

Historical

Nazi Germany
Brandenburger Regiment

United Kingdom
Special Operations Executive more a direct action organization, but conducted some reconnaissance. Espionage was under the continuing Secret Intelligence Service

United States
Office of Strategic Services
2671st Special Reconnaissance Battalion

Australia
Services Reconnaissance Department
Combined Field Intelligence Service (Coastwatchers)
Allied Intelligence Bureau

References

Intelligence gathering disciplines